, born in Niigata, Japan, is a female Japanese enka singer and occasional voice actress and voice provider of VOCALOID 4 Sachiko developed by YAMAHA co. She previously worked alongside the Pokémon Company, under the alias "Garura Kobayashi".

Biography
When Kobayashi was 9 years old in 1963, she became a champion in the TBS-produced  music variety show and was scouted by famous Japanese composer and guitarist Masao Koga. Although Kobayashi was only a grade four student, her voice was said to be exactly like well-known Japanese enka singer Hibari Misora.

One year later, Kobayashi and her family left their hometown, Niigata, Niigata and headed to Tokyo where she released her debut song, .

The drama's ending song was also credited to her. However, after 1968, Kobayashi's level of celebrity dropped, thus causing her to get fewer TV appearances and other opportunities.

In 1979, her song  became the best seller of the year, winning the 21st Japan Record Awards, and causing her to be popular again. As a result, she was asked to take part in the illustrious annual end-of-year music show "Kōhaku Uta Gassen". After 1979, Kobayashi was considered one of the most famous enka singers in Japan until now. Her more recent activity has intersected with Japanese otaku culture.

In July 2015, a Vocaloid called "Sachiko" was released by Yamaha based upon her voice for the Vocaloid 4 engine.

In April 2018, coinciding with the launch of her official YouTube channel, Kobayashi debuted her Virtual Youtuber persona, Virtual Grandmother Sachiko Kobayashi. At Nico Nico Chōkaigi, she collaborated with fellow Vtuber Kizuna AI on a cover of Vocaloid Hatsune Miku's song "Senbonzakura". Kobayashi also had a recurring "Virtual Grandmother" segment in 2019 Vtuber sketch comedy show, "VIRTUAL-SAN - LOOKING".

Discography

Singles
 (1964.06.05)
 (1964.09)
 (1964.11)
 (1965.01)
  (1965.03）
 (1965.05)
 (1965.07)
 (1965.09)
 (1965.11)
 (1966.02)
 (1966.06)
 (1966.11)
 (1967.01)
 (1967.08)
 (1968.04)
 (1969.11)
 (1970.02)
 (1970.08)
 (1971.04)
 (1971.09)
 (1972.07)
 (1973.06)
 (1976.08)
 (1977.08)
 (1977.10.25)
 (1978.01.25)
 (1978.06.21)
 (1979.01.25)
 (1979.01.25)
 (1980.01.01)
 (Unknown)
 (1980.06.01)
 (1980.09.25)
 (1981.02.10)
 (1981.06.11)
 (1982.01.01)
 (1982.06.25)
 (1983.01.25)
 (1984.01.25)
 (1984.07.10)
 (1984.09.25)
 (1985.02.25)
 (1986.02.25)
 (1986.09.10)
 (1987.06.25)
 (1988.02.25)
 (1989.06.25)
 (1989.02.25)
 (1989.09.25)
 (1990.04.10)
 (1990.11.15)
 (1991.08.25)
 (1992.06.21)
 (1992.07.10)
 (1993.02.22)
 (1993.04.10)
 (1993.04.10)
 (1993.10.10)
  (1994.03.25)
 (1995.06.25)
  (1996.08.30)
 (1997.08.30)
 (1997.12.10)
 (1997.12.10)
 (1997.12.10)
 (1997.12.10)
 (1997.12.10)
 (1998.02.10)
 (1998.02.21)
 (1998.09.03)
 (1999.01.01)
 (1999.09.10)
 (1999.09.22)
 (2000.01.01)
 (2000.04.21)
 (2001.01.01)
 (2001.01.01)
 (2001.04.21)
 (2001.09.01)
 (2002.01.01)
 (2002.06.21)
 (2002.12.05)
 Ribbon(2003.01.01)
 (2003.01.01)
 (2003.08.20)
 (2004.03.03)
 (2006.06.21)
 (2007.06.21)
 (2008.02.20)
 (2008.08.20)
 (2009)
 (2010.01.27)
 (2010.10.17)
  (2011.06.01)
 (2013.06.05)
 (2014.06.04)
 (2015.06.03)
 (2015.10.28)
 (2016.07.06)
 (2016.07.13)
 (2016.08.18)
  (2017.12.06)
 (2019.02.06)

Album
  (1964.11)
  (1978.06)
  (1979.07.25)
  (1979.11.28)
  (1980.04.25)
  (1980.07.25)
  (1980.08.10)
  (Unknown 1980)
  (1980.12.23)
  (1981.04.25)
  (Unknown 1981)
  (Unknown 1981)
  (Unknown 1982)
  (Unknown 1982)
  (Unknown 1982)
  (Unknown 1983)
  (Unknown 1983)
  (1984.04.25)
  (1984.11.28)
  (1985.04.25)
  (1985.11.28)
  (1986.04.25)
  (1986.12.10)
  (1987.11.10)
  (1988.09.10)
  (1989.09.10)
  (1990.06.25)
  (1990.12.21)
  (1991.06.25)
  (1991.12.10)
  (1992.10.25)
  (1992.12.05)
  (1993.06.25)
  (1993.10.21)
  (1994.06.25)
  (1995.12.21)
  (1996.10.19)
  (1996.10.25)
  (1997.05.21)
  (1997.10.04)
  (1998.04.21)
  (1998.06.05)
  (1998.08.01)
  (1998.11.21)
  (1999.02.20)
  (1999.05.01)
  (1999.08.21)
  (2000.02.19)
  (2000.09.01)	
  (2001.01.20)
  (2001.04.21)
  (2001.11.21)
  (2002.04.20)
  (2002.10.19)
  (2002.12.04)
  (2003.06.05)
  (2003.10.22)
  (2004.05.19)
  (2004.10.20)
  (2005.07.20)
  (2005.10.19)
  (2006.06.21)
  (2006.10.18)
  (2007.07.04)
  (2007.10.17)
  (2008.06.18)
  (2008.10.01)
  (2008.11.19)
  (2009.05.20)
  (2009.10.21)
  (2010.06.23)
  (2010.10.20)
  (2011.03.23)
  (2011.03.23)
  (2011.10.19)
  (2012.05.23)
 S (2013.09.04)
 K (2013.12.04)
  (2014.08.17)
  (2015.08.17)
 SACHIKO THE BEST (2016.12.26)
 PINSPOT ～Sachiko's Night Club～ (2018.07.04)

Other songs
"Poketto ni Fantajī" (Ending for Pokémon: Original Series Chapter 1: Sekiei Rīgu), sung with Juri Ihata)
"Pokémon Ondo" (Ending for Pokémon: Original Series Chapter 1: Sekiei Rīgu) & Pokémon: Original Series Chapter 2: Orenji Shōto Hen) sung with Unshō Ishizuka & Kōichi Sakaguchi)
"Yokoso Arks" (Collaboration song for Phantasy Star Online 2, collaborated with Beat Mario)
"Kaze to issho ni" (Ending for  Pokémon Movie 1: Myūtsū no Gyakushū)
"Kaze to issho ni" (Ending for  Myūtsū no Gyakushū EVOLUTION, sung with Shoko Nakagawa)
"Suteki na Korekushon" (from the Pokémon: Kaze to issho ni album), sung with Raymond Johnson
"Torikaekko Purīzu" (from the Pokémon: Torikaekko Purīzu album)

Filmography

Movie
Zatoichi's Revenge (座頭市二段斬り with Shintaro Katsu) 1965
A Certain Killer (ある殺し屋 with Ichikawa Raizō VIII) 1967
Kewaishi (化粧師 KEWAISHI with Kippei Shiina) 2002
Devilman (デビルマン) 2004

TV Anime
Pokémon (ポケットモンスター) 1997
Yatterman (ヤッターマン) 2008
Danganronpa: The Animation (ダンガンロンパ) 2013 – "Monokuma Ondo" (モノクマおんど)
 VIRTUAL-SAN - LOOKING (バーチャルさんはみている) 2019 - as Virtual Grandmother Sachiko Kobayashi

TV commercials

Pippu Erekiban (ピップエレキバン)
Honda Airwave (ホンダ・エアウェイブ), 2007
Toyo Suisan (東洋水産), 2010
 Nyanko Daisensou (にゃんこ大戦争) 2014
 Niigata-gen; Niigata-gen policeman Tokushu Sagi Higai Boushi Keihatsu "Kiken Sacchi" (新潟県・新潟県警察 特殊詐欺被害防止啓発)「危険さっち」), 2016
 Kirin: Hyoketsu (キリン「氷結」), 2016
Cup Noodles (日清食品 カップヌードル), 2016–present

TV Dramas
 DCU 2022 - as Aki Negishi (ep. 7)

Kōhaku Uta Gassen Appearances

Dubbing
Meet the Robinsons (Mildred)

References

External links
 Official website
 
 
 
 

Actors from Niigata Prefecture
Enka singers
Japanese film actresses
Japanese television actresses
Japanese voice actresses
Japanese women singers
Musicians from Niigata Prefecture
Living people
Vocaloid voice providers
1953 births
20th-century Japanese actresses
20th-century Japanese women singers
20th-century Japanese singers
21st-century Japanese actresses
21st-century Japanese women singers
21st-century Japanese singers
VTubers